Chałupy is a Seaside resort and a Polish village with conditions favorable for windsurfing and kitesurfing, in Gmina Władysławowo. It is situated between Władysławowo and Kuźnica on the Hel Peninsula on the southern Baltic Sea in Puck County, Pomeranian Voivodeship, northern Poland. Its population in 2009 was 376.

In 1836 the village was the site of one of the last, if not the last, lynchings related to accusations of sorcery, when a widow Krystyna Ceynowa was killed by a mob after being accused of being a witch.

In 1939 the village saw some fighting during the battle of Hel. The Germans captured it on 25 September, and around the same time, in its vicinity, Polish military engineers detonated torpedo warheads, temporarily transforming the Peninsula's far end into an island.

Before 1 January 2015, Chałupy was part of the town of Władysławowo.

Toward the last years of communist rule in Poland the locality became famous as the site of a government-legal nudist beach.

Gallery

References

External links 

 www.chalupy.pl - Official website
www.google/maps/lemonpark - Lemon Park Władysławowo on Google Maps

Puck County
Neighbourhoods in Poland